R380 may refer to:

Ericsson R380, mobile phone made by Ericsson,  released in 2000
Prince R380, racing car built in 1965 by Prince Motor Company
R380 road (South Africa), a Regional Route in South Africa